Shahid Chamran Expressway, Also known as Parkway Expressway is an expressway in Tehran, Iran, leading from Tohid Square to Parkway Junction. Chamran is the oldest expressway in Tehran, and is unofficially called Parkway Expressway or  just Parkway for short. The expressway is named after Mostafa Chamran.

, main intersections of Chamran Expressway, from south to north, include dissecting Bagher Khan Street, passing under Jalal-e-Ale Ahmad Expressway at Nasr Bridge, passing under Resalat Expressway and then Hemmat Expressway, and passing under Niayesh Expressway at Velayat Bridge. It changes its direction to west-east near Seoul Street.

Pictures

References

Expressways in Tehran